Mari Hansen (born 1966) is a Finnish curler. She competed at the World Senior Curling Championships in 2017, 2018, and 2019.

References

External links

1966 births
Living people
Finnish female curlers